Urszula Sadkowska (born 6 February 1972) is a Polish judoka. She is 6 ft 4in tall.
Polish judoka Urszula Sadkowska was 2005 European U23 Champion. Silver at the 2009 European Championships in Tbilisi and bronze in 2010 in Vienna. The heavyweight won the World Cup in Prague and Tallinn in 2007 and Madrid in 2009. In 2003 she won silver at the European Junior Championships

Achievements

External links
 
 

1984 births
Living people
Polish female judoka
Judoka at the 2008 Summer Olympics
Judoka at the 2012 Summer Olympics
Olympic judoka of Poland
Sportspeople from Olsztyn
21st-century Polish women